Frank Hanson (born 30 July 1965) is a Ghanaian Air Force Officer and Pilot holding the rank of Air Vice Marshal. He currently serves as the Chief of Air Staff of the Ghana Air Force, a position he assumed in January 2019.

Notes 

1965 births
Living people
Ghanaian military personnel
Chiefs of Air Staff (Ghana)
Ghana Air Force personnel